James J. Gross is a psychologist best known for his research in emotion and emotion regulation.  He is a professor at Stanford University and the director of the Stanford Psychophysiology Laboratory.

Education 
Gross received his B.A. in philosophy from Yale University in 1987, where he was awarded the Alpheus Henry Snow Prize.  He was a graduate visiting student at Oxford University from 1987 to 1988 and received a Ph.D. in Clinical Psychology from the University of California, Berkeley in 1993.

Work in psychology 
Gross' contributions to psychology lie primarily in the area of emotion regulation through psychophysiological research.  He has published numerous, frequently cited papers regarding emotion regulation, and recently edited the Handbook of Emotion Regulation.

Awards and fellowships 
Gross has been the recipient of numerous academic awards from psychological and educational associations:
Bass University Fellow in Undergraduate Education, Stanford University, 2004–2009.
Outstanding Young Researcher Award, Western Psychological Association, 2003.
Gordon and Dailey Pattee Faculty Fellowship, Stanford University, 2001–2002.
Early Career Award, American Psychological Association, 2001.
Early Career Award, Society for Psychophysiological Research, 2000.
Banks Faculty Fellow in the Social Sciences, Stanford University, 1997–1998.
Fellow, American Psychological Society, 1997.
Dean's Award for Distinguished Teaching, Stanford University, 1996–1997.
Robert E. Harris Award, University of California, San Francisco, 1994.
Tursky Award, Society for Psychophysiological Research, 1991.
Berkeley Graduate Fellowship, University of California, Berkeley, 1988–1991.
Alpheus Henry Snow Prize, Yale University, 1987.

References

External links 
 James Gross's homepage

Year of birth missing (living people)
Living people
Emotion psychologists
Jewish American scientists
Stanford University Department of Psychology faculty
21st-century American Jews